LIVE 34 is a Big Finish Productions audio drama based on the long-running British science fiction television series Doctor Who.

Plot
On Colony 34, LIVE 34 is a news station delivering news every hour of every day. But there are explosions happening and people are dying — or are they? What is the connection between Citizen Doctor, a Rebel Queen and a paramedic named Hex?

Cast
The Doctor — Sylvester McCoy
Ace — Sophie Aldred
Hex — Philip Olivier
Drew Shahan — Andrew Collins
Premier Jaeger — William Hoyland
Charlotte Singh — Zehra Naqvi
Ryan Wareing — Duncan Wisbey
Gina Grewal — Ann Bryson
Lula — Joy Elias-Rilwan

Notes
The entire play is presented in the style of a factual radio broadcast, and to that end the play is devoid of the Doctor Who theme music (although snatches of the McCoy-era version of the tune can be heard in parts of the "tuning" sequences at the start of the episodes) as well as incidental music, or trailers for future Big Finish releases. Also each act takes place in real time. The four episodes are separated by static, and there are no episode reprises in the following parts.
Ace does not appear in Part 1 of this play. Hex does not appear in Parts 1 or 2.

External links
Big Finish Productions – LIVE 34

2005 audio plays
Seventh Doctor audio plays